Copestylum florida is a species in the family Syrphidae ("syrphid flies"), in the order Diptera ("flies"). The species is known generally as the Florida bromeliad fly.

Distribution
Florida, North Carolina, South Carolina.

References

Further reading
 Ross H. Arnett. (2000). American Insects: A Handbook of the Insects of America North of Mexico. CRC Press.

External links
Diptera.info

Eristalinae
Diptera of North America
Hoverflies of North America
Insects described in 1941
Taxa named by Frank Montgomery Hull